Luca Bigatello (born 15 September 1953) is a former Italian male long-distance runner who competed at one edition of the IAAF World Cross Country Championships at senior level (1974).

References

External links
 

1953 births
Living people
Italian male long-distance runners
Italian male cross country runners